Volastra is a village in the Cinque Terre National Park, Italy.  The population is less than 200 residents.  The most notable building in Volastra is Nostra Signora della Salute ("Our Lady of Health"). The church is constructed in the Romanesque style, possibly dating to the twelfth century.

External links
 Amici di Volastra (in English)
 Santuario di Nostra Signora della Salute - Volastra (in English)

Coastal towns in Liguria
Frazioni of the Province of La Spezia
Italian Riviera
World Heritage Sites in Italy